Ian Wilton Powe (17 October 1932 – 2 September 2017) was a Royal Navy officer who developed new techniques for tracking submarines during the Cold War. He commanded HMS Yarmouth during the "Cold War".

He was later director of the Gas Consumers' Council for ten years and served as churchwarden at St Paul's Church, Knightsbridge. There he was arrested in connection with the alleged blackmailing of a homosexual priest but was released without charge and later received an apology from the Metropolitan Police.

References 

1932 births
2017 deaths
Royal Navy officers
Churchwardens
People from Bognor Regis